Esarhaddon's Treaty with Ba'al is an Assyrian clay tablet inscription describing a treaty between Esarhaddon (reigned 681 to 669 BC) and Ba'al of Tyre. It was found in the Library of Ashurbanipal.

The first fragment published, K 3500, was published in the mid-nineteenth century. It was identified as a combined tablet by Hugo Winckler in his Altorientalische Forschungen, II ("Ancient Near Eastern Studies") in 1898.

The treaty was part of a large two-column tablet containing an account of Esarhaddon's conquest of Eber Nari. Under the terms of the treaty, Esarhaddon entrusted Baal with several settlements, including Akko, Dor, and Byblos.

The third column has received the most focus from scholars. The text is below:
Esarhaddon, king of Assyria, these cities which... The royal deputy whom I have appointed over you, ... the elders of your country, ... the royal deputy ... with them ... the ships ... do not listen to him, do not ... without the royal deputy; nor must you open a letter which I send you without the presence of the royal deputy. If the royal deputy is absent, wait for him and then open it, do not... If a ship of Ba'al or of the people of Tyre (KUR.ṣur-ri) is shipwrecked off the coast of the land of Pilistu (KUR.pi-lis-ti) or anywhere on the borders of Assyrian territory, everything that is on the ship belongs to Esarhaddon, king of Assyria, but one must not do any harm to any person on board ship, they should list their names and inform the king of Assyria... These are the ports of trade and the trade roads which Esarhaddon, king of Assyria, granted to his servant Ba'al; toward Akko (URU.a-ku-u), Dor (URU.du-uʾ-ri), in the entire district of Pilistu (KUR.pi-lis-te), and in all the cities within Assyrian territory, on the seacoast, and in Byblos (URU.gu-ub-lu), across the Lebanon (KUR.lab-na-[na]), all the cities in the mountains, all the cities of Esarhaddon, king of Assyria, which Esarhaddon, king of Assyria gave to Ba'al ..., to the people of Tyre (KUR.ṣur-ri), in their ships or all those who cross over, in the towns of Ba'al, his towns, his manors, his wharves, which ..., to ..., as many as lie in the outlying regions, as in the past ... they..., nobody should harm their ships. Inland, in his district, in his manors...

External links
 The Tablet in the British Museum
 The Assyrian Eponym Canon, George Smith, 1875, page 140
 ANET, p533
 State Archives of Assyria Online (SAAo) SAA02 005
 https://books.google.com/books?id=1zi2i_C1aNkC&pg=PA222&lpg=PA222
 https://www.academia.edu/829037/Did_Nehemiah_Own_Tyrian_Goods_Trade_between_Judea_and_Phoenicia_during_the_Achaemenid_Period
 https://archive.org/stream/jstor-1507593/1507593#page/n12/mode/1up
 https://www.jstor.org/stable/23283872
 http://cdli.ucla.edu/P336126

References

7th-century BC inscriptions
1898 archaeological discoveries
Assyrian inscriptions
7th century BC in Assyria
History of Palestine (region)
Library of Ashurbanipal
7th-century BC treaties
675 BC
Esarhaddon
History of Phoenicia